Dženan Ćatić (born May 26, 1992) is a Bosnian former footballer.

Playing career

College and youth
He attended East Kentwood High School. After graduation he spent time with the youth team and second team of German club 1. FC Kaiserslautern, Catic moved back to the United States to play NAIA college soccer at Davenport University.

While at college, Catic played with USL PDL club Michigan Bucks during their 2014-15 season, where he scored 16 goals in 14 appearances.

Professional
On January 15, 2015, Catic was selected 31st overall in the 2015 MLS SuperDraft by Philadelphia Union. He signed with the club on March 1, 2015.

Catic was loaned to the Union's USL partner club Harrisburg City Islanders in March 2015.

Catic signed with USL club Rio Grande Valley FC Toros on February 1, 2016. Catic opted to miss the 2017 season due to concussion.

Personal
Catic is a dual citizen of the United States and Bosnia & Herzegovina.

References

External links
 

1992 births
Living people
People from Jablanica, Bosnia and Herzegovina
Bosnia and Herzegovina emigrants to the United States
Soccer players from Michigan
Association football forwards
Bosnia and Herzegovina footballers
American soccer players
1. FC Kaiserslautern II players
Flint City Bucks players
Philadelphia Union draft picks
Philadelphia Union players
Penn FC players
North Carolina FC players
Rio Grande Valley FC Toros players
Regionalliga players
North American Soccer League players
USL League Two players
Bosnia and Herzegovina expatriate footballers
American expatriate soccer players in Germany
Bosnia and Herzegovina expatriate sportspeople in Germany
American expatriate soccer players